Bhojpur Dharampur is a town and a nagar panchayat in Moradabad district  in the state of Uttar Pradesh, India.

Demographics
 India census, Bhojpur Dharampur had a population of 30,395. Males constitute 53% of the population and females 47%. Bhojpur Dharampur has an average literacy rate of 42%, lower than the national average of 59.5%; with male literacy of 50% and female literacy of 30%. 21% of the population is under 6 years of age.

References

Cities and towns in Moradabad district